Mehdi Fard Ghaderi (Persian: مهدی فرد قادری ; born 1986) is an Iranian ِFilm Director, Screenwriter and Producer.

Biography 
Mehdi Fard Ghaderi was born in 1986 in Iran. In 2007 he started to write scripts and directing short films. After ten years he wrote and directed eight short films. 

"Immortality" in 2016 his first feature film, was created in one shot without a cut in 145 minutes on a train. This film was nominated for best film at the Rome Film Festival, Munich Film Festival and Transilvania International Film Festival.  "Immortality" won several international prizes, such as Best Film of the 16th Ischia Festival, This film also screened at more than thirty international festivals.

His second feature film is titled "Weightlessness" and was made in 2019; it has won some awards at international film festivals. 

Mehdi Fard Ghaderi was producer of the film "The Son" in 2021. This film has won prizes at the Moscow Film Festival and was shown in at the Rotterdam Film Festival and Valladolid Film Festival.

His third movie as a Director and Producer is "The Afflicted" in 2022.

He has been a judge in several international festivals. In 2022, he was the head of the Jury of the Eurasian Film Festival in Russia and as a jury member at the Ischia Film Festival Italy and Brno Sixteen Film Festival Czech Republic.

Filmography 
Feature films

Short films

Awards and Nominations

References 

Iranian filmmakers
Iranian film directors
Iranian film producers
Iranian screenwriters
1986 births
Living people